The Big South Conference men's soccer tournament is a men's college soccer tournament that determines the Big South Conference's automatic berth into the NCAA Division I men's soccer tournament. Held annually since 1984, the tournament is the oldest active NCAA Division I men's college soccer tournament.

With 12 titles, Coastal Carolina has won the most Big South tournaments of all members past and present. Winthrop has the most titles of current Big South Conference members, with five.

Winners

Key

Finals

References

External links 
 
 Big South Men's Soccer Record Book